Breien is a Norwegian surname. Notable people with the surname include:
 Anja Breien (born 1940), Norwegian film director
 Bård Breien (born 1971), Norwegian film director
 Haakon Hasberg Breien (1864–1942), Norwegian judge
 Thor Breien (1899–?), Norwegian judge

See also
 Breien, North Dakota, United States

Norwegian-language surnames